Deliciosa fruta seca is a 2017 Peruvian drama film written and directed by Ana Caridad Sanchez in her directorial debut. Starring Claudia Dammert. The film is proposed as "a tribute to the marinera, to women and to the conquest of freedom."

Synopsis 
A 60-year-old widow is facing financial problems, so she decides to fend for herself, even without the help of her children. As a way to rebuild her life, she decides to learn to be a sailor, where she will meet an important person.

Cast 

 Claudia Dammert as Marialicia
 Hugo Vasquez as Carlos
 Mauricio Fernandini as Rodolfo
 Mónica Domínguez as Claire
 Cinthya Calderón
 Natalia Cárdenas
 Claudia Herrán

Production

Financing 
The film received support from Ibermedia in the 2011 Call. For post-production, it received the 2016 Feature Film Post-Production Project award from the National Contest of the Audiovisual, Phonography and New Media Directorate (DAFO) of the Ministry of Culture of Peru.

Filming 
It was filmed in November 2013 in Trujillo, Peru.

Music 
The film's soundtrack includes original music by Pauchi Sasaki and the marineras by Lucy de Mantilla. Among the sailors included are "Chucuturrita" and "Alma y corazón".

Release 
It premiered on April 27, 2017, within the framework of the Festival de Cinéma Péruvien de Paris. It was released on August 6, 2017, during the 21st Lima Film Festival. It was commercially released on June 27, 2019, in Peruvian theaters.

Awards

References

External links 

 

2017 films
2017 drama films
Peruvian drama films
2010s Spanish-language films
2010s Peruvian films
Films set in Peru
Films shot in Peru
Films about music and musicians
Films about old age
2017 directorial debut films